Ivo Ratej (born 11 September 1941) is a Slovenian ice hockey player. He competed in the men's tournaments at the 1964 Winter Olympics, the 1968 Winter Olympics and the 1972 Winter Olympics.

References

1941 births
Living people
Slovenian ice hockey defencemen
Olympic ice hockey players of Yugoslavia
Ice hockey players at the 1964 Winter Olympics
Ice hockey players at the 1968 Winter Olympics
Ice hockey players at the 1972 Winter Olympics
Sportspeople from Celje
Yugoslav ice hockey defencemen
Yugoslav expatriate ice hockey people
Expatriate ice hockey players in West Germany
Yugoslav expatriate sportspeople in West Germany
Adler Mannheim players
KHL Medveščak Zagreb players